Alice Erya Gerstenberg (2 August 1885 – 28 July 1972) was an American playwright, actress, and activist best known for her experimental, feminist drama and her involvement with the Little Theatre Movement in Chicago.

Background
Gerstenberg was born in Chicago, Illinois, the only child of Julia and Erich Gerstenberg. Gerstenberg's grandfather was a founder and member of the Chicago Board of Trade in 1848, a position Gerstenberg's father inherited later on, which meant that the Gerstenbergs enjoyed a higher standard of living than most middle-class families in Chicago at the time. Growing up, Gerstenberg had ample travel experiences and social indulgences including commercial theater. She attended a private school in Chicago and later graduated from Bryn Mawr, a women's college in Pennsylvania, in 1907.  After college, she spent some time in New York watching the rehearsals of David Belasco before returning home to Chicago.

Career
After living in New York for a period, Gerstenberg returned to Chicago, where she continued to write plays; became involved with the Little Theatre movement, supported her parents, and exercised a strong feminist dedication to bringing non-commercial theater to new playwrights, children, and Chicagoans. Her previous involvement with the theater during her childhood, the plays she wrote at college, as well as the time spent in New York led her to continue writing plays for the rest of her life, working occasionally as an actress, and maintaining an activist role in the theater. Although the majority of her plays have largely been forgotten, her magnum opus Overtones has continued to be produced since its publication in 1913.

Themes and plays
In 1913, Gerstenberg wrote Overtones, a one-act play, her second stage play, and her most frequently performed and printed, which was first produced in November 1915 by the Washington Square Players at the Bandbox Theater in New York. It has been anthologized alongside Susan Glaspell’s Trifles as a textbook case of modern one-act plays by women involved in the little theater movement. The play crystallizes her use of experimental form with a familiar dramatic conflict. The play enjoyed many productions due to its innovative use of the split subject, a technique Eugene O'Neill would later use in his play Strange Interlude. Gerstenberg continued to write many one-act plays early on in her career, many of which were performed by regional or little theaters in and around Chicago. The majority of these plays demonstrate her feminist tendencies – critiquing the social roles and decision which constrained women of the time.  Gerstenberg continued to write plays throughout her life, later on publishing several radio plays as well as several commissioned dramatizations of children's stories.

Regional theater and the Little Theater Movement
Gerstenberg's influence on the theater is not limited to her early experimental forms; she played a crucial role in the foundation and success of several theater companies as well as the Little Theater Movement in Chicago. In 1921, she founded the Junior League Children's Theater in Chicago; in 1922 she founded the Playwrights Theater; and finally she supported an amateur theater company that was eventually named for her at its foundation in 1955.

Her work with these theater companies demonstrates her commitment to making non-commercialized theater available to new playwrights, giving them the opportunity to see their plays produced; regional playwrights, demonstrating an appreciation for Chicago and the Midwest; and finally to children, giving them an early experience with the theater, the opportunities to act, write, and become involved. Furthermore, she hoped that her work would bring Chicagoans to support non-commercial theater.

Gerstenberg was one of a handful of women invited to speak at the National Drama Council and National Theatre Conference. In 1936 she was an invited speaker at three AETA conferences and she won the Chicago Foundation for Literature Award in 1938.

Gerstenberg remained involved in the theater throughout her life, whether as a writer, actor, or activist. She had many opportunities to move to New York, but instead chose to remain in Chicago. Many of her female Midwestern colleagues, such as Zoe Akins and Susan Glaspell, began writing in the Midwest but moved to New York where their work was frequently produced, giving them a firmer canonical standing. Many criticize Gerstenberg for not moving to New York when she had the opportunity, believing that she is a playwright who had a great start in Chicago but failed to develop her style.  Others cite that Gerstenberg's decision to remain in Chicago demonstrates her commitment to the Little Theater movement, women's issues in the Midwest and a developed sense for the regional community that she wrote for and about.

Plays and novels
Plays 
 A Small World (1908)
 Overtones (1913), one-act edition
 Alice in Wonderland (1915), dramatization of Lewis Carroll's Alice's Adventures in Wonderland and Through the Looking Glass
 The Buffer (1916)
 Beyond (1917)
 Hearts (1917)
 Attuned (1918)
 The Unseen (1918)
 Illuminati in Drama Libre (1919)
 Fourteen (1920)
 Ten One-Act Plays (1921)
 The Pot Boiler or The Dress Rehearsal (1923)
 Four Plays for Women (1924)
 Mah-Johngg (1924)
 Their Husband (1924)
 Ever Young (1924)
 Seaweed (1924)
 At the Club (1925)
 The Land of "Don’t Want To" (1928), dramatization of Lilian Bell's children's story

 Overtones (1929), three act edition
 Comedies All (1930)
 The Water Babies (1930), dramatization of Charles Kingsley's work
 Sentience (1933)
 Glee Plays the Game (1934)
 Within the Hour (1934)
 Across the River (1939), radio play
 Lake Front (1939), radio play
 Time for Romance (1940)
 Got Your Number (1942, unpublished)
 ‘’Victory Belles ‘’ (play) 1944)
 On the Beam (1963, unpublished)
 Time for Living  (1969)
 Concordia (Unpublished, n.d.)
 Port of Chicago (Unpublished, n.d.)
 The Hourglass (n.d.)
Novels
 Unquenched Fire (1912)
 The Conscience of Sarah Platt (1915)

Legacy
Gerstenberg's play Overtones, her most frequently performed and printed work, was adapted into the chamber opera The Clever Artifice of Harriet and Margaret in 2013 by composer-librettist Leanna Kirchoff. The opera won the National Opera Association's 2014-2016 Chamber Opera Composition Competition, and was given its professional premiere by Really Spicy Opera at the Minnesota Fringe Festival in 2015. The opera was later staged by the National Opera Association and Gateway Opera in 2016.

Further reading
 Shafer, Yvonne.  (1995) American Women Playwrights 1900 – 1950 (1995)
 Maddock, Mary. (1994) Alice Gerstenberg's Overtones: The Demon in the Dell
 Hecht, Stuart.  (1992) The Plays of Alice Gerstenberg: Cultural Hegemony in the American Little Theater
 Atlas, Marilyn. (1982) Alice Gerstenberg's Psychological Drama

References

External links
 
 
 
 Alice Gerstenberg Papers at The Newberry Library
 Opera minus the high costs and testosterone

1885 births
1972 deaths
American stage actresses
Bryn Mawr College alumni
20th-century American novelists
American women novelists
American women dramatists and playwrights
Actresses from Chicago
Writers from Chicago
20th-century American actresses
20th-century American women writers
20th-century American dramatists and playwrights
Novelists from Illinois